Pietro Giovanni Leonori (active 1400) was an Italian painter of the Bolognese school. Leonori painted Madonna & Saints in the Custom's House, and decorated several public buildings with frescoes.

References

14th-century Italian painters
Italian male painters
Painters from Bologna
Year of birth unknown
Year of death unknown
Trecento painters